Camillina is a genus of ground spiders that was first described by Lucien Berland in 1919. They are very similar to sister genus Zelotes.

Species
 it contains seventy-five species:

C. aldabrae (Strand, 1907) – Africa, Seychelles. Introduced to Malaysia (Borneo)
C. antigua Platnick & Shadab, 1982 – Guatemala, Honduras
C. arequipa Platnick & Shadab, 1982 – Peru
C. balboa Platnick & Shadab, 1982 – Panama, Colombia
C. bimini Platnick & Shadab, 1982 – Bahama Is.
C. biplagia Tucker, 1923 – South Africa
C. brasiliensis Müller, 1987 – Brazil
C. caldas Platnick & Shadab, 1982 – Brazil
C. calel Platnick & Shadab, 1982 – Argentina
C. campeche Platnick & Shadab, 1982 – Mexico
C. capensis Platnick & Murphy, 1987 – South Africa
C. cauca Platnick & Shadab, 1982 – Colombia
C. cayman Platnick & Shadab, 1982 – Cayman Is.
C. chiapa Platnick & Shadab, 1982 – Mexico
C. chilensis (Simon, 1902) – Brazil to Chile, Juan Fernandez Is.
C. chincha Platnick & Shadab, 1982 – Peru
C. claro Platnick & Shadab, 1982 – Brazil
C. colon Platnick & Shadab, 1982 – Panama
C. cordifera (Tullgren, 1910) (type) – Central, Southern Africa, Seychelles
C. cordoba Platnick & Murphy, 1987 – Argentina
C. cruz Platnick & Shadab, 1982 – Ecuador (Galapagos Is.)
C. cui Platnick & Murphy, 1987 – Paraguay
C. desecheonis (Petrunkevitch, 1930) – Puerto Rico
C. elegans (Bryant, 1940) – Caribbean. Introduced to Angola, Pacific islands
C. europaea Dalmas, 1922 – Italy
C. fiana Platnick & Murphy, 1987 – Madagascar, Comoros
C. gaira Platnick & Shadab, 1982 – Colombia, Caribbean
C. galapagoensis (Banks, 1902) – Ecuador (Galapagos Is.)
C. galianoae Platnick & Murphy, 1987 – Argentina
C. huanta Platnick & Shadab, 1982 – Peru
C. isabela Platnick & Murphy, 1987 – Ecuador (Galapagos Is.)
C. isla Platnick & Shadab, 1982 – Ecuador (Galapagos Is.)
C. javieri Alayón, 2004 – Cuba
C. jeris Platnick & Shadab, 1982 – Curaçao
C. kaibos Platnick & Murphy, 1987 – Ivory Coast to Kenya
C. kochalkai Platnick & Murphy, 1987 – Paraguay
C. longipes (Nicolet, 1849) – Chile
C. madrejon Platnick & Murphy, 1987 – Paraguay
C. mahnerti Platnick & Murphy, 1987 – Paraguay
C. major (Keyserling, 1891) – Brazil, Argentina
C. marmorata (Mello-Leitão, 1943) – Argentina, Bolivia
C. maun Platnick & Murphy, 1987 – Southern Africa
C. mauryi Platnick & Murphy, 1987 – Argentina
C. merida Platnick & Shadab, 1982 – Venezuela
C. minuta (Mello-Leitão, 1941) – Argentina
C. mogollon Platnick & Shadab, 1982 – Peru
C. mona Platnick & Shadab, 1982 – Jamaica
C. namibensis Platnick & Murphy, 1987 – Namibia
C. nevada Platnick & Shadab, 1982 – Colombia
C. nevis Platnick & Shadab, 1982 – Caribbean
C. nova Platnick & Shadab, 1982 – Brazil, Paraguay, Argentina
C. oruro Platnick & Shadab, 1982 – Bolivia, Peru, Argentina
C. pavesii (Simon, 1897) – Africa
C. pecki Baert, 1994 – Ecuador (Galapagos Is.)
C. pedestris (O. Pickard-Cambridge, 1898) – Mexico
C. penai Platnick & Murphy, 1987 – Chile, Peru
C. pernambuco Müller, 1987 – Brazil
C. pilar Platnick & Murphy, 1987 – Paraguay, Argentina
C. piura Platnick & Shadab, 1982 – Peru
C. procurva (Purcell, 1908) – South Africa
C. puebla Platnick & Shadab, 1982 – Mexico, Honduras
C. pulchra (Keyserling, 1891) – Brazil, Argentina. Introduced to USA
C. punta Platnick & Shadab, 1982 – Peru
C. recife Müller, 1987 – Brazil
C. relucens (Simon, 1893) – Venezuela
C. rogeri Alayón, 1993 – Cuba
C. samariensis Müller, 1988 – Colombia
C. sandrae Baert, 1994 – Ecuador (Galapagos Is.)
C. setosa Tucker, 1923 – South Africa
C. shaba FitzPatrick, 2005 – Congo
C. smythiesi (Simon, 1897) – India
C. tarapaca Platnick & Shadab, 1982 – Chile
C. taruma Platnick & Höfer, 1990 – Brazil
C. tsima Platnick & Murphy, 1987 – Madagascar
C. ventana Ferreira, Zambonato & Lise, 2004 – Argentina

See also
 List of spiders of India
 List of spiders of Texas
 List of spiders of Madagascar

References

Araneomorphae genera
Cosmopolitan spiders
Gnaphosidae
Taxa named by Lucien Berland